The Gifted is a 2014 Filipino Comedy revenge-romance film written and directed by Chris Martinez. The Gifted was produced by Viva Films and MVP Entertainment. The film stars Anne Curtis, Sam Milby, and Cristine Reyes. It was released September 3, 2014.

The Film was nominated at the 31st PMPC Star Awards for Movies for the "Movie of the Year" category. Anne Curtis, who played one of the lead roles was also nominated for the "Movie Actress of the Year" category.

Plot 
Marco Yuzon (Sam Milby) is attending a book signing event for his new book, The Gifted. He begins by reading a few chapters of the book.

Zoe Tuazon (Anne Curtis) is a mixed race, rich, overweight, aggressive, and intelligent girl who goes to a school for an entrance exam with the unattractive Aica Tabayoyong (Cristine Reyes) and their parents. Both of the students are highly gifted but are not admitted to the school. Instead, they get enrolled at a more prestigious school.

One day, during religion class, Zoe ruins her reputation when she questions the story of creation and discusses the merits of the big bang theory. The next day, Aica ruins her name when she soils herself during a music lesson. The two outcasts become close friends and start causing trouble at school by poisoning students and a teacher and by setting a booby trap for the religion teacher. The entire school develops a fear of the two.

Now in high school, Zoe (Anne Curtis) and Aica (Cristine Reyes) vie for the valedictory honors. Zoe's mother (Arlene Muhlach) convinces her to find Aica's weakness to prevent Aica achieving this. A new student, Mark Ferrer  (Sam Milby), a stereotypical jock, arrives at the school, and Aica immediately falls in love with him prompting Zoe to proceed with her destructive plan. Zoe meets up with Mark and convinces him to pretend to fall in love with Aica. In exchange Zoe does his homework and helps him cheat on quizzes. While he is not attracted to Aica, Mark forces himself to date her. Mark and Zoe's arrangement continues.

After high school, Aica majors in Mathematics at the Ateneo de Manila University while Zoe goes to Princeton to study Neuroscience. Both girls graduate with summa cum laude honors at their university.

Before returning to the Philippines, Zoe and Aica undergo extensive plastic surgery to become more attractive. Both start a career in modelling and again become rivals. Zoe bumps into Mark who has graduated from a university in the U.S. Still furious with Aica, Zoe plots revenge and shows everybody the animated video version of Aica soiling herself pants during grade school.

Aica follows Zoe to her house and, as Aica enters, a booby trap almost kills her . After Zoe's several attempts of killing Aica backfire, Zoe finally gives up after Aica almost drowns her. The two make up, but Zoe reveals it was just an act and points a gun at Aica. Aica runs for her life only to bump into Mark who shields her from the gun shot, wounding his face. Mark is admitted to the hospital while Aica asks Zoe to apologize. At first, she shows no remorse, but upon seeing  of a picture of Mark wounded, she realizes her mistake. Aica and Mark get married the day that Zoe plans to leave the country. She sets a trap in the couple's hotel room which leads to a picture of young Zoe and Aica. Zoe has left the couple a letter apologizing for the things she had done which marks the end of the Marco's book.

After the book signing, Marco Yuzon leaves the bookstore. A girl slams a copy of his book on his windshield; she turns out to be Aica. Zoe is with her, but the two have remained the same; before they received cosmetic surgery. The two, whose real names are Mica (Aica) and Joey (Zoe), are very angry at Marco who was their classmate in grade school and high school. Marco has always been envious of the girls' successes and is bitter for always placing third behind two girls. The novel is his way expressing his anger. The girls tell Marco they want him to sign their book with his blood and started to beat him up.

Cast

Main cast
Anne Curtis as Zelda Olezia Eloize "Zoe" Gomez Tuazon / Joey
Cristine Reyes as Aica Tabayoyong / Micah
Sam Milby as Mark Ferrer / Marco Yuzon

Supporting cast
Candy Pangilinan as Aica's Mother
Dominic Ochoa as Aica's Father
Arlene Muhlach as Zoe's mother
Ricky Rivero as Zoe's Father
Isay Alvarez
Yam Concepcion
Ana Abad Santos as Ms. Moral
Kalila Aguilos
Rubi-Rubi
Racquel Villavicencio as Sister Angeline

Guest cast
Alliya Fatima dela Riva as young Aica Tabayoyong / Micah
Kevin Remo as young  Mark Ferrer / Marco Yuzon
Abby Bautista as young Zoe Tuazon / Joey
Ashley "Petra Mahalimuyak" Rivera
Shehyee Ongkiko as Batchmate
Irish Den Lanting
Van Dyke Atienza as Taho vendor

Awards and nominations

References

External links

 

2014 films
Philippine romantic comedy films
2014 romantic comedy films
Films set in 2004
Films set in 2014
Viva Films films
Films directed by Chris Martinez